Engeyum Kadhal is a 2011 Indian Tamil-language romance comedy film written and directed by Prabhu Deva that stars Jayam Ravi and Hansika Motwani. Featuring music by Harris Jayaraj, it was produced by Kalpathi S. Aghoram and released on 6 May 2011 to mixed reviews but became a box office hit. The story revolves around an Indian girl living in France who falls in love with an Indian boy visiting from India.

Plot
The film is set in France and Italy. Kamal, a young billionaire, doesn't believe in love. He works hard for 11 months and takes a month's break from all the work related commitments. Celloist Kayalvizhi (Kayal for short or Lolita for Kamal) believes in true love and is highly fascinated with Indian culture. Then she sees Kamal one day and it is love at first sight for her, but before she can follow him he gets into his car and goes away. Her father Rajasekhar runs a small detective agency in France and Kayal often reads her father's case files for interesting stories. One day, Rajasekhar gets a new client who wants to know about his girlfriend's mystery man. After a brief investigation, Rajasekhar finds that his client's girl friend is dating Kamal.

Sonu gets angry and decides to kill Kamal. Kayal overhears the conversation and deciding to save them, rushes to their hotel. Sonu has sent some men to kill Kamal and he is on his way there. When Kayal reaches Kamal's room she finds the door locked from inside. Without knowing what to do Kayal tries to get inside through the balcony. When she was about to enter she hears a gunshot and faints in the balcony. By this time Sonu's girlfriend has escaped from there. Just when Kamal is about to win the fight Sonu enters the room and threatens Kamal with a gun. Then he searches for his girlfriend he cannot find her, instead he find Kayal in the balcony. Then he thinks that Rajasekar has made a mistake and apologises to Kamal. Understanding that Kayal has saved him, he tries to get to know her better during their incidental meetings and, even though Kayal tries to resist, she cannot. Kamal leaves Paris for some board meetings and Kayal is heart broken.

When he returns he does not remember her immediately even though she has been waiting for him. Kayal tries to make Kamal love her by pretending to have many boyfriends. Kamal does get a bit jealous and he decides to get a detective to know everything about her and her possible boyfriends. Initially the detective he chooses is Rajasekar Kayal's dad. Kamal does not know Kayal's name, but he says about all her fake boyfriends. Rajasekar realises that the girl's boyfriends' names are same as the names of the people in his case files realises that Kamal is actually inquiring about his daughter, Kayal, as only she has seen them. He tells Kamal about it and asks him to leave his daughter as he always does when someone falls in love with him. Kamal agrees and tells Kayal that he will be leaving for Germany and that he does not know when he will return. Kayal is heartbroken. Kamal tries to forget her but find that he cannot as he realises that he too loves her. So he returns to Paris and finds her. But Kayal is angry with him and walks away. Kamal runs after her saying that he is in love with her and will never leave her and they will be together thereafter.

Cast

Production
Prabhu Deva initially named this film as Paris. It was developed under the title Ich until it was finally renamed Engeyum Kadhal in 2010. The name was changed to seek tax exemption. 158 women auditioned for the heroine before Hansika Motwani was selected. The composition of the songs took place in Sydney toward the end of 2009. The film started its shooting schedule in Paris on 2 June 2009, canning scenes featuring Ravi and Hansika. The video clip of the song "Nenjil Nenjil" was made in Santorini Island in Greece and Thee Illai song was shot in New Zealand.

Soundtrack
The music is scored by Harris Jayaraj. The soundtrack was scheduled to release on 3 October but was postponed "due to Enthiran mania". The audio launch, was held on 8 November by Sony Music, exactly ten years after Jayaraj's first album Minnale was released. The soundtrack turned out to be Sony's Best Selling Album in 2011. The song "Nangaai" is inspired by Micheal Jackson's "The Way You Make Me Feel". The track "Dhimu Dhimu" was earlier released as "Chilipiga" in the Telugu film Orange. As part of the film score, a song "Kulu Kulu Venpani Pola" was additionally composed, penned by Jayaraj and sung by a new singer Arjun.

Critical response
The soundtrack received positive reviews from music critics. Indiaglitz mentioned that "Overall, Engeyum Kadhal is one of the best albums of the year. All of the songs bear the Harris stamp and "Engeyum Kadhal" and "Nenjil Nenjil" stand out to be real melodies. " C. Karthik from Behindwoods.com gave a 3/5 rating and said "Overall, Engeyum Kadhal is a breezy, romantic album with a few different sounds and percussions. A few songs bear the typical Harris Jayaraj stamp and the rest are ready to stay in the Top 10 list for a while. We feel that Harris wanted to play it safe, devoid of any experiments, though Bathing in Cannes could appeal as a new genre in Tamil music. The album will definitely appeal to the masses and once the videos go on air, it is certain to make more people inquisitive!" Pavithra Srinivasan of Rediff also gave a 3/5 rating and said "Engeyum Kadhal might sound, at times, like it's a mishmash of Harris Jeyaraj's previous works, but it does have its melodious moments, and those make the album worth a listen."

Release

Reception
Rohit Ramachandran of nowrunning.com rated it 2.5/5 stating that "Engeyum Kadhal was marketed as a breezy entertainer. It delivers what it promises".
Pavithra Srinivasan from Rediff gave 2.5 out of 5 stating that "Engeyum Kadhal is one of those movies that promises a lot, but delivers little. Watch the film only if you're in the mood for arm-chair travel to Paris and foot-tapping music". Behindwoods gave 1.5 out of 5 saying that the film was "all glitz, no substance", further adding that "although Prabhu Deva has major supporting features by his side, he has failed to use them to the fullest." Sify stated that the film "tries too hard to maintain a tempo, but save for the crackling chemistry and some charming moments involving Ravi and Hansika, the film is just average".

Box office
The film had an average opening and the collections in Chennai were 2.50 crore after 3 weeks. It was declared a 'average' film by the trade pundits. After the film failed at the box office, the makers of the film dubbed it in Telugu as Ninnu Choosthe Love Vasthundi.

Awards

References

External links
 

2011 romantic drama films
Films directed by Prabhu Deva
2011 films
Indian romantic drama films
2010s Tamil-language films
Films scored by Harris Jayaraj
Films shot in Paris
Films shot in Italy